What Kinda Music is a collaborative studio album by English guitarist and singer Tom Misch and English drummer Yussef Dayes. It was released on 24 April 2020 through Misch's label Beyond the Groove, and distributed through Blue Note Records and Caroline. It is Misch's highest-charting album and Dayes' first appearance in the charts, peaking at number four in the United Kingdom.

Background and release 

Both members of South London's contemporary jazz scene, Misch and Dayes met at the launch party for Misch's 2018 album Geography. Misch had been a fan of Dayes' work in his former duo Yussef Kamaal. Misch and Dayes recorded What Kinda Music in a series of jam sessions, some of which were fully improvised.

Misch and Dayes shot a series of music videos for the album in Kyiv, Ukraine. During this shoot, alongside bassist Rocco Palladino, they recorded an impromptu jam session on a spare roll of tape that became the track "Kyiv," named after the city where it was improvised. On YouTube, they released music videos for "Kyiv," "Lift Off," the title track "What Kinda Music," and "Nightrider," which features a rap verse from Freddie Gibbs.

In July 2020, Misch and Dayes released a virtual concert for NPR's Tiny Desk Concerts series, on which they performed "Nightrider" and "Tidal Wave" from the album. The concert also features guest singers Jordan Rakei and Joel Culpepper, bassists Rocco Palladino and Tom Driessler, and guitarist John Mayer.

On 2 October 2020, Misch and Dayes released an EP titled What Kinda Music (Bonus Tracks), containing four previously unreleased tracks from What Kinda Music recording sessions.

Composition 

As the title suggests, What Kinda Music is difficult to classify into a genre, blurring the lines of acid jazz, psychedelia, hip hop, and electronica. It blends the contrasting styles of Misch, known for his polished R&B and neo soul melodies and Instagram-trendy guitar tone, with Dayes, a jazz drummer with more experimental leanings.

The album's style has been described by critics as "cosmic" and "dreamy" due to its heavy use of reverb. Its production, spearheaded by Misch, is warm and saturated, with Dayes' drums emphasized in the mix. The album's final track "Storm Before the Calm" is the only track with a saxophone, featuring saxophonist Kaidi Akinnibi.

Critical reception 

What Kinda Music was met with positive reviews. At Metacritic, the album received an aggregate score of 71 based on 6 reviews, indicating "generally favorable reviews."

Writing for Pitchfork, reviewer Jemima Skala called the album "an expansive and fruitful collaboration" between Misch and Dayes "that brings out the best in each other." In a positive review for The Line of Best Fit, reviewer Joseph Blais praised the album's production and innovative mix of styles, calling it "a warm, vibe-y album for hype beasts and chops aficionados alike." Writing for Clash, contributor Kofi Yeboah-Mensah called the album "an incredible collaboration," noting its "highly effective combination of lead bass and drums." Charlotte Krol of NME called the album "a smooth, intuitive coagulation of sounds spanning acid jazz, hip-hop and electronica," complimenting the artists' musicianship and synergy, but also calling it at times "disengaging" and "probably more fun to make than it is to hear."

Track listing

References 

Tom Misch albums
2020 albums
Blue Note Records albums
Caroline Records albums